The Netherlands participated in the Junior Eurovision Song Contest 2022 in Yerevan, Armenia. National broadcaster AVROTROS was responsible for the participation and selected the nation's entrant,  with the song "La festa", via national final .

Background 

The Netherlands is the only country to have participated in every edition of the Junior Eurovision Song Contest since the inaugural  edition. She finished in 19th place with 43 points; the first last place result for the Netherlands.

Before Junior Eurovision

Junior Songfestival 2022 
AVROTROS selected the Dutch representative through the televised national final , on 24 September 2022 at the RTM Stage in Rotterdam, a part of the Ahoy venue complex.

Competing entries 
Following the 2021 edition of the competition, the submissions process was opened for singers who want to represent the Netherlands at the 2022 contest. Following a call for participants which closed in February, NPO Zapp revealed the list of singers who made it through to the auditions round in March 2022. The finalists were revealed on 10 and 17 June 2022, during two episodes published on the official Junior Songfestival YouTube channel. Twenty three acts past the audition stage and fourteen of them were selected to be the finalists of Junior Songfestival 2022. The four acts that will compete in the final of Junior Songfestival 2022 were revealed on 24 June 2022. The line-up consists of three groups: a girl group, a boyband, a mixed group and a soloist, being the first line-up in over a decade in which this mix of performers has competed.

Final
The final took place on 24 September 2022, hosted by Matheu Hinzen and Stefania. During the online voting window, the finalists performed a common theme song titled "Living in the Moment". The winner was determined through points given by a kids jury, a professional jury and public voting, each having equal weight. The kids jury consisted of Junior Songfestival 2021 winner Ayana and finalists Shine and Priscilla, and the professional jury consisted of Chantal Janzen, Flemming and Glen Faria. Overall, the show had an average of 187,000 viewers with a share of 5.2%. The average number of viewers increased by 45,000 viewers compared to 2021 and the market share increased by 1.3%.

At Junior Eurovision 
After the opening ceremony, which took place on 5 December 2022, it was announced that the Netherlands would perform first on 11 December 2022 preceding Poland.

Voting

Detailed voting results

Notes and references

Notes

References 

Netherlands
2022
Junior Eurovision Song Contest